Moongapara is a village near Thopramkudy in the Taluk of Udumbanchoola in Idukki District. The moongapara city is actually a junction. There is a temple for murugan.

References

Villages in Idukki district